YSII or Ys II may refer to:
 Ys II: Ancient Ys Vanished – The Final Chapter, a 1988 video game
 NAMC YS-11, a commercial airliner
 Saibai Island Airport, Saibai Island, Queensland, Australia
 the second Ys anime series